Irmgard Hermann (4 October 194226 May 2020) was a German actress. She worked in film, television, and the stage, appearing in over 160 film and television productions. She was discovered, without formal training, by Rainer Werner Fassbinder who cast her in many of his films. She was awarded the Deutscher Filmpreis for playing Irmgard Epp in Fassbinder's The Merchant of Four Seasons, and again for appearing as Else Gebel, a woman in prison with Sophie Scholl, in Percy Adlon's Fünf letzte Tage.

Life 
Born in Munich, Hermann became a publishing clerk after finishing school and worked as a secretary for ADAC. She met Rainer Werner Fassbinder in 1966, who convinced her to quit her job to work with him although she lacked formal training as an actress. The same year, Hermann made her debut in Fassbinder's short film The City Tramp, and then went on to play in 19 of Fassbinder's films, including Die bitteren Tränen der Petra von Kant (The Bitter Tears of Petra von Kant, 1972). She was usually cast as a frustrated, stuffy (spießig) woman. Her one leading role in his films, Irmgard Epp in the 1971 Händler der vier Jahreszeiten (The Merchant of Four Seasons), won her the Deutscher Filmpreis award. She was a member of Fassbinder's complicated professional and personal entourage, and became one of his confidantes, but the relationship also involved abusive behaviour by Fassbinder towards her; after his death, she said he had been physically abusive.

In the mid-1970s, Hermann broke with Fassbinder and moved to Berlin, where her career developed. She played in numerous film and television productions with directors such as Tankred Dorst, Werner Herzog, Hans W. Geißendörfer and Christoph Schlingensief. Her performance as Else Gebel, a woman in prison with the resistance fighter Sophie Scholl, in Percy Adlon's 1982 Fünf letzte Tage (Last Five Days) was again honoured with a Deutscher Filmpreis in 1983. She liked to play in comedies such as Loriot's 1991 Pappa Ante Portas, Hape Kerkeling's 1996 Willi und die Windzors (as a fictionalized version of Queen Elizabeth II) and Rudolf Thome's 1999 . Paradiso won a Silver Bear at the 2000 Berlinale for artistic achievement (künstlerische Leistung). She also appeared in Rosa von Praunheim's film Fassbinder's Women (2000).

Overall, she appeared in over 160 film and television productions until 2018. She played on stage at the Berlin Volksbühne and with the Berliner Ensemble.

Hermann was married to Dietmar Roberg, an author of children's books.  Together, they had two sons (Franz Tizian and Fridolin).  She died on 26 May 2020 in Berlin.  She was 77, and had been suffering from a “short, serious illness”, according to her agent.

Filmography (selection) 
Hermann's film appearances included:

Fassbinder 
 Katzelmacher (1969) as Elisabeth
 Warum läuft Herr R. Amok?) (Why Does Herr R. Run Amok?, 1970) as Neighbour
 Der amerikanische Soldat (The American Soldier, 1970) as Whore
  (Pioneers in Ingolstadt, after Marieluise Fleißer's play, 1972) as Irmgard Epp
 Händler der vier Jahreszeiten (The Merchant of Four Seasons, 1972) as Irmgard Epp
 Die bitteren Tränen der Petra von Kant (The Bitter Tears of Petra von Kant, 1972) as Marlene
  after the play by Franz Xaver Kroetz (1975) as police woman
 Acht Stunden sind kein Tag (Eight Hours Don't Make a Day, 1973, TV miniseries) as Irmgard Erlkönig
 Effi Briest (1974) as Johanna
 Faustrecht der Freiheit (Fox and His Friends, 1974) as Madame Cherie
 Angst essen Seele auf (Ali: Fear Eats the Soul, 1974) as Krista
 Mutter Küsters' Fahrt zum Himmel (Mother Küsters' Trip to Heaven, 1975) as Helene Küsters
  (1975) as Lore
 Berlin Alexanderplatz (1980, TV miniseries) as Trude
 Lili Marleen (1980) as Nurse

Geißendörfer 
 Sternsteinhof (The Sternstein Manor, 1976) as Sali
 Der Zauberberg after Thomas Mann's novel (1982) as Fräulein Engelhart

Werner Herzog 
 Woyzeck after Büchner's drama (1979) as Margret

Percy Adlon 
 Fünf letzte Tage (1982) as Else Gebel

Ulrike Ottinger 
  (1984) as Passat
 Joan of Arc of Mongolia (1989) as Fräulein Müller-Vohwinkel

Schlingensief 
 Das deutsche Kettensägenmassaker (The German Chainsaw Massacre, 1990) as GDR borderwoman
  (1997) as Irm Hermann

Rudolf Thome 
  (1998) as Birgit Kirschstein
  (2000) as Berenice

Other directors 
 The Passenger – Welcome to Germany (1988) as concentration camp commander, directed by Thomas Brasch
 Pappa Ante Portas (1991) as Hedwig, directed by Loriot
  (1995, TV film) as Isolde Krautinger
 Willi und die Windzors (1996, TV film) as Queen Elizabeth II, directed by Hape Kerkeling
 Die Affäre Semmeling (2002, TV mini series) as financial officer
 My Brother Is a Dog (2004) as Oma Gerda
 A Woman in Berlin (2008) as widow
 Faust Sonnengesang (2011) (voice)
  (2012) as Marianne Oberrotter
  (2012, TV series) as Frau Johansson
 Die Libelle und das Nashorn (2012) as Verlegerin
 Stuttgart Homicide (2012, TV series) as Ilse Vogelmann
 Die Erfindung der Liebe (2012) as Johanna von Kirsch
 Fack ju Göhte 3 (2017) as Ploppi's grandma
  (2018, TV miniseries) as Marianne Labaule

References

External links 

 
 

1942 births
2020 deaths
Actresses from Munich
German film actresses
German television actresses
20th-century German actresses
21st-century German actresses
Best Actress German Film Award winners